The 2022 Copa LP Chile, also known as 2022 LP Open by IND, for sponsorship reasons, was a professional women's tennis tournament played on outdoor clay courts. It was the fifth edition of the tournament and first ever as a WTA 125 which was also part of the 2022 WTA 125 tournaments. It took place at the Hacienda Chicureo Club in Colina, Chile between 7 and 13 November 2022.

Champions

Singles

  Mayar Sherif def.  Kateryna Baindl 3–6, 7–6(7–3), 7–5

Doubles

  Yana Sizikova /  Aldila Sutjiadi def.  Mayar Sherif /  Tamara Zidanšek 6–1, 3–6, [10–7]

Singles main-draw entrants

Seeds

 1 Rankings are as of 31 October 2022.

Other entrants
The following players received wildcards into the singles main draw:
  Fernanda Astete
  Tímea Babos
  Fernanda Labraña
  Daniela Seguel
  Mayar Sherif

The following players received entry from the qualifying draw:
  Yvonne Cavallé Reimers
  Bethanie Mattek-Sands
  Lena Papadakis
  Diana Shnaider

Withdrawals
Before the tournament
  Réka Luca Jani → replaced by  Caroline Dolehide
  Anna Kalinskaya → replaced by  Yuki Naito
  Elizabeth Mandlik → replaced by  Darya Astakhova
  Kristina Mladenovic → replaced by  İpek Öz
  Camila Osorio → replaced by  Rosa Vicens Mas
  Chloé Paquet → replaced by  Carole Monnet
  Katrina Scott → replaced by  Sára Bejlek

Doubles entrants

Seeds 

 1 Rankings as of 31 October 2022.

Other entrants 
The following pair received a wildcard into the doubles main draw:
  Fernanda Labraña /  Daniela Seguel

References

External links
 2022 Copa LP Chile at wtatennis.com
 Official website

2022 WTA 125 tournaments
2022 in Chilean tennis
November 2022 sports events in Chile